Weissenberger is a surname. Notable people with the surname include:

Markus Weissenberger (born 1975), Austrian footballer
Theodor Weissenberger (1914–1950), German fighter ace
Thomas Weissenberger (born 1971), Austrian footballer

See also
Weisenberger
Berger
Weissenberg (disambiguation)
Weissenberge